Cieślar and Cieślarz are occupational surnames literally meaning 'carpenter'. It may refer to:

Adam Cieślar (born 1992), Polish Nordic combined skier
Mieczysław Cieślar (1950-2010), Lutheran theologian and bishop of the Evangelical Augsburg Church in Poland
Zdeněk Cieslar (born 1973), Czech footballer

Polish-language surnames
Occupational surnames